Mud Lake is a lake in the U.S. state of Washington.

Mud Lake was so named on account of the muddy condition of its waters.

References

Lakes of Thurston County, Washington